"Switch" is a song by American actor and rapper Will Smith. It was released on February 14, 2005, as the first single from his fourth studio album, Lost and Found (2005), via Interscope Records. Smith co-wrote the song with Kwame "K1 Mil", who also produced the track, and Lennie Bennett. Upon its release, the single topped the Australian Singles Chart, peaked at number seven on the US Billboard Hot 100, and became a top-10 hit in several other countries.

Live performances
Will Smith performed the song live on the Nickelodeon's 2005 Kids' Choice Awards with former JammX Kids members Alyson Stoner and Monica Parales as his backup dancers, at San Antonio before Game 1 of the 2005 NBA Finals between the Detroit Pistons and the San Antonio Spurs, on BET's 106 & Park, and at the Live 8 concert in Philadelphia.

Commercial performance
"Switch" was Smith's highest-charting single from Lost and Found. On the chart dated April 16, 2005, the song peaked at number one on the Billboard Hot Digital Songs chart, selling 40,000 digital copies. The peaked at number seven on the Billboard Hot 100, becoming Smith's third and last Hot 100 top 10 hit. It reached number one in Canada and Australia, where it remained for one week, and number four in the United Kingdom.

The song was released days after Hitch, which Smith starred in and produced.  It did not appear in the film or soundtrack.

Track listings

US promo CD
 "Switch" (album version) — 3:17
 "Switch" (instrumental) — 3:15
 "Switch" (a cappella) — 3:15

UK and Australian CD single
 "Switch" — 3:17
 "Switch" (main RnB remix) — 3:47 (3:46 in Australia)
 "Switch" (instrumental RnB remix) — 3:48
 "Switch" (video) — 3:30

European CD single
 "Switch" — 3:17
 "Switch" (main RnB remix) — 3:46

European maxi-CD single
 "Switch" — 3:17
 "Switch" (main RnB remix) — 3:46
 "Switch" (instrumental RnB remix) — 3:48

Digital download
 "Switch" — 3:16

Digital download – Remix
 "Switch" (R&B remix)  — 3:46

Credits and personnel
Credits are lifted from the Australian CD single liner notes.

Studios
 Recorded at the Boom Boom Room (Los Angeles, California, US) and the Cutting Room Studios (New York City)
 Mixed at the Boom Boom Room (Los Angeles, California, US)

Personnel
 Will Smith – writing (as Willard Smith), vocals
 Kwamé Holland – writing, production (as Kwame "K Mil")
 Lennie Bennett – writing
 O. Banga – vocal production
 Pete Novak, Dylan Margerum – recording engineers
 Kevin (KD) Davis – mixing

Charts

Weekly charts

Year-end charts

Decade-end charts

Certifications

Release history

See also
 List of number-one singles of 2005 (Australia)
 List of UK R&B Singles Chart number ones of 2005
 List of Billboard Hot 100 top-ten singles in 2005
 List of number-one Billboard Hot Digital Songs of 2005

References

2004 songs
2005 singles
Interscope Records singles
Music videos directed by Paul Hunter (director)
Number-one singles in Australia
Songs written by Kwamé
Songs written by Will Smith
Will Smith songs